Cubicle 7 Entertainment Ltd is an Irish games company that creates and publishes tabletop games. Best known for its Doctor Who and Lord of the Rings games, Cubicle 7 offers titles covering a range of licensed and self-developed properties.

History
Angus Abranson and Dave Allsop formed the role-playing game company Cubicle 7 with the aim of publishing new material for Allsop's role-playing game SLA Industries. Abranson brought on his friend, Dominic McDowall-Thomas, in January 2004 to edit the books, but later in 2004 production was halted and Allsop left Cubicle 7 for other opportunities.  In late 2006, Abranson and McDowall-Thomas formed Cubicle 7 Entertainment Limited, as its partners. In 2006, Cubicle 7 purchased the British small-press publisher Heresy Games and published a new edition of their 2003 role-playing game Victoriana in 2009.  The company's first licensed game was obtained in 2006, with Starblazer Adventures published in 2008. Cubicle 7 then licensed the French game Qin: The Warring States in 2007 and also got the license to produce their 2009 Doctor Who Roleplaying Game.  In 2008, Cubicle 7 began partnering with small-press publishers to do the publishing and distribution for them, including Adamant Entertainment, Alephtar Games, Arc Dream Publishing, Cakebread & Walton, Arion Games, John Wick Presents, Khepera Publishing, Monkey House Games, Postmortem Studios, Savage Mojo, and Triple Ace Games.

Cubicle 7 relocated from Oxford, United Kingdom to Stamullen, Ireland in 2018.

Games

Role-playing games
Cubicle 7 designs, develops and publishes the following role-playing games:
 Doctor Who Roleplaying Game (role-playing game based on the TV series)
  Won an Origins Award for Best Card Game in 2013.
 Primeval (role-playing game based on the TV series)
 The Laundry (role-playing game based on the Laundry Files series of novels)
 Cthulhu Britannica (a series of supplements and adventures set in historical England, for the Call of Cthulhu role-playing game)

 Victoriana (roleplay in an fantasy alternative Victorian era). The game published by Heresy Games in 2003, with second and third editions by Cubicle 7 in 2009 and 2013. It was reviewed by Black Gate #15 (Spring 2011)
 World War Cthulhu (a fantasy World War II and Cold War setting for the Call of Cthulhu RPG - it requires the Call of Cthulhu rulebook to play)
 Rocket Age (a retro-pulp space opera role-playing game, set in an alternative 20th century where Einstein, Tesla and Ray Armstrong rode the first rocket ship to Mars, entering in a new space opera era)
 Warhammer Fantasy Role-Play - the 4th edition of the venerable fantasy rpg
 Soulbound: Warhammer Age of Sigmar Role-Play - a separate game from Fantasy Role-Play
 Wrath & Glory - A Warhammer 40,000 role-playing game, transferred from Ulisses Spiele. Cubicle 7 published an updated version of the core rulebook in April 2020.

Cthulhu Britannica

Cthulhu Britannica is a series of role-playing game supplements produced by the British game company Cubicle 7 Entertainment for use in the Call of Cthulhu role-playing game produced by Chaosium. The series allows for games to be set in the United Kingdom. Cubicle 7's Call of Cthulhu license resulted in the Cthulhu Britannica (2009) core book, which included five scenarios. Additional books were then released every year until 2012, including Shadows over Scotland.  In 2013 a Kickstarter campaign was run in order to produce a boxed set and series of supplements set in London, with the London Boxed Set set being released in the following year.

Former licenses
 Adventures in Middle-earth (a licensed OGL compatible Middle-earth setting for 5th Edition)
 The One Ring Roleplaying Game (the current Middle-earth licensed official role-playing game)
Cubicle 7 announced on 27 November 2019 that they would cease publishing The One Ring and Adventures in Middle-earth properties. Cubicle 7 had published The One Ring for eight years at that time.
 Lone Wolf Adventure Game (based on Joe Dever's Lone Wolf gamebook series)
Cubicle 7 announced on 2 July 2021 that they would cease publishing the Lone Wolf Adventure Game property.

Card, dice and board Games
Cubicle 7 designs, develops and publishes the following card, dice and board games:
 Doctor Who: The Card Game (based on the TV series)
 Hobbit Tales (story telling card game set in Middle-earth)
 Dalek Dice (A Doctor Who push your luck dice rolling game)

Translations from French into English
Cubicle 7 translates and publishes the following role-playing games from the French publisher "Le Septième Cercle":
 Qin (a wuxia role-playing game, set in China during the Warring States period)
 Yggdrasill (roleplay in the Viking Age)
 Kuro (a horror-cyberpunk role-playing game, set in Japan in the year 2046)
 Keltia (roleplay in the post-Roman Britain, during the 5th century)

Publishing partners
Cubicle 7 also works with a select group of publishing partners to bring their games to a wider market:
 Hot War (Contested Ground)
 Cold City (Contested Ground)
 3:16 - Carnage Amongst the Stars (Box Ninja Games)

Awards
Cubicle 7 has won 12 ENnie Awards, 2 Origins Awards, Best in Show, Lucca 2012 and a Golden Geek.

Notable events

In June 2009, Cubicle 7 announced that it had joined the Rebellion Developments group of companies.

In November 2011, Angus Abranson left Cubicle 7 to form Chronicle City.

In December 2014, Cubicle 7 announced that it had left the Rebellion Developments group of companies, following a successful management buy out led by CEO Dominic McDowall.

In December 2017, Dominic McDowall and Cubicle 7 announced that they would be producing a new RPG in the Warhammer universe, Warhammer: Age of Sigmar. This game has been part of a personal quest of McDowall to bring back the style of play with Warhammer he had played in his youth.

References

External links
 
 Old official website

Publishing companies established in 2006
Role-playing game publishing companies
2006 establishments in England
Publishing companies of Ireland